Shoal Creek is a stream in Georgia, and is a tributary of the Soque River.

Course

Shoal Creek rises in northern Habersham County, Georgia, south of Lake Rabun, and runs in a southerly direction for approximately 2.6 miles, before it joins with Alley Creek, coming from its east. Just under a mile further on, Shoal Creek picks up Nerve Branch, and continues southward for 1.3 miles to cross State Route 197, just before flowing into the Soque River west of the highway.

Sub-watershed details
The creek watershed and associated waters is designated by the United States Geological Survey as sub-watershed HUC 031300010202, is named the Upper Soque River sub-watershed, and drains an area of approximately 28 square miles west of Turnerville, and north and east of the Soque River.  In addition to Shoal Creek, the area is drained by Ben Tatum Branch and Porters Mill Branch, both of which flow into the Soque south of where Shoal Creek joins the river, and east of State Route 197.

See also
 Water Resource Region
 South Atlantic-Gulf Water Resource Region
 Apalachicola basin

References

External links
Soque River Watershed Association

Shoal Creek (Soque River)
Rivers of Habersham County, Georgia